The black-fronted white-eye (Zosterops chrysolaemus) is a songbird species. It is closely related to the Old World babblers, and its family Zosteropidae might better be included in the Tiimalidae. The black-fronted white-eye was formerly considered a subspecies of the green-fronted white-eye, (Zosterops minor), and until it was split as a distinct species, the name "black-fronted white-eye" was also used for Z. minor.

It is found in New Guinea. Quite common, it is not considered a threatened species by the IUCN.

References

black-fronted white-eye
Birds of New Guinea
black-fronted white-eye
black-fronted white-eye